Henry Needler (1685–1760) was a British musician and prolific music transcriber. He joined the Academy of Ancient Music in 1728 (shortly after its founding), and transcribed a number of works of what was then termed "ancient" music from the 16th and 17th centuries that was no longer contemporary. Twenty-six volumes of his manuscripts are in the British Library, among which are six volumes of works by Palestrina.

References
 

1685 births
1760 deaths
British performers of early music
British classical musicians
British writers about music